Potamanaxas flavofasciata, the yellowbanded skipper, is a butterfly in the family Hesperiidae. It is found in Ecuador, Peru and Bolivia.

Subspecies
Potamanaxas flavofasciata flavofasciata (Ecuador, Peru)
Potamanaxas flavofasciata pantra Evans, 1953 (Bolivia)

References

Butterflies described in 1870
Erynnini
Hesperiidae of South America
Taxa named by William Chapman Hewitson